Mochloribatula is a genus of mites in the family Mochlozetidae. There are about eight described species in Mochloribatula.

Species
These eight species belong to the genus Mochloribatula:
 Mochloribatula bahamensis Norton, 1983
 Mochloribatula calycifera Mahunka, 1985
 Mochloribatula depilis (Ewing, 1909)
 Mochloribatula floridana (Banks, 1904)
 Mochloribatula grandjeani Mahunka, 1978
 Mochloribatula metzi Norton, 1983
 Mochloribatula multiporosa Mahunka, 1978
 Mochloribatula texana (Ewing, 1909)

References

Further reading

 

Acariformes
Articles created by Qbugbot